Taybor Pepper (born May 28, 1994) is an American football long snapper for the San Francisco 49ers of the National Football League (NFL). He played college football at Michigan State.

College career
Pepper attended Michigan State University where he served as starting long snapper all four years from 2012 to 2016, playing a total 54 career games. In 2015, analyst Phil Steele named Pepper to the preseason second All-America team.

Professional career

Green Bay Packers
After going undrafted in the 2016 NFL Draft, Pepper was not signed by a team during the 2016 season. On January 27, 2017, he signed a reserve/futures contract with the Green Bay Packers.

Baltimore Ravens
On August 28, 2017, Pepper signed with the Baltimore Ravens, but was waived four days later.

Green Bay Packers (second stint)
On September 25, 2017, Pepper resigned with the Packers to replace an injured Brett Goode. On November 3, 2017, he was placed on injured reserve after suffering a broken foot in practice.

New York Giants
On January 2, 2019, Pepper signed a reserve/future contract with the New York Giants. He was waived on August 31, 2019.

Miami Dolphins
On September 2, 2019, Pepper signed with the Miami Dolphins. He was waived on April 26, 2020.

San Francisco 49ers
On September 30, 2020, Pepper signed with the San Francisco 49ers. He was placed on the reserve/COVID-19 list by the team on December 28, 2020, and activated on February 2, 2021. On February 4, 2021, Pepper signed a two-year contract extension with the 49ers. 

On February 25, 2023, Pepper signed a three-year contract extension with the San Francisco 49ers.

References

External links
Taybor Pepper on Twitter
San Francisco 49ers bio
Michigan State Spartans bio

Living people
1994 births
People from Saline, Michigan
Players of American football from Michigan
American football long snappers
Michigan State Spartans football players
Green Bay Packers players
Baltimore Ravens players
New York Giants players
Miami Dolphins players
San Francisco 49ers players
Twitch (service) streamers